Fushenjan ( also Romanized as Fūshenjān), also known as Pushtanghan or Pushenjan in the historic sources of The Quarter of Nishapur in Khorasan, is a village in Fazl Rural District, in the Central District of Nishapur County, Razavi Khorasan Province, Iran. At the 2006 census, its population was 1,457, in 421 families.

This village has been claimed to be the birthplace of Haji Bektash Veli by Ministry of Cultural Heritage, Handicrafts and Tourism of Iran and is home to Baktash Archaeological Site of Nishapur which was uncovered by an archeological group led by the archeological department of the University of Neyshabur in an archeological excavation project initiated in the year 2016. This site is part of the Iran National Heritage list with the national registration number of 24383. There is no historical source or record which implies that Bektash was really born in Fushenjan. The cited websites clearly show that the Iranian government invented the place for tourist attraction and missionary activity.

Accessibility 
This village and the village of Hamidabad are situated next to each other and are accessible by car from the road 44 of Iran along with different routes from the Baghrud Road of Nishapur (Persian: جاده باغرود نیشابور). They are also really close to the capital city of the county, Nishapur and a road known as the Baghrud Road is used as their main pathway to the capital city.

References 

Populated places in Nishapur County

Nishapur Quarter
Bektashi Order